The Rushville Republican was a two-day (Tuesday and Friday) morning daily newspaper serving Rushville, Indiana, and Rush County. It was owned by Community Newspaper Holdings Inc.

Having begun publication as the Rushville Whig in 1840, the Republican claims to be the oldest daily still operating in Indiana.

On May 15, 2020, the Republican printed its last edition and merged with the Greensburg Daily News.

References

External links 
 Rushville Republican Website
 CNHI Website

Newspapers published in Indiana
Rush County, Indiana